Aralam  is a village and Grama Panchayat in Kannur district in the Indian state of Kerala.

Demographics
As of 2011 Census, Aralam had a population of 29,328 people which constitutes 14,438 males and 14,890 females. The sex ratio of Aralam was 1,031 lower than state average of 1,084. Population of children in the age group 0-6 was 3,180 (10.8%) where 1,617 are males and 1,563 are females. Aralam had an overall literacy of 89.9% lower than state average of 94%. The male literacy stands at 92.7% and female literacy was 87.3%.

Economy
Aralam Panchayat is mainly an agrarian economy. The major cultivated crops are Coconut, Cashew, Pepper, Rubber and Areca nut here. Aralam was one of severely affected areas in Kannur district during 2018 Kerala floods. 20 hectares of cash crops like Coconut, Cashew and Pepper was washed away by landslides and cyclones and 5 hectares by heavy rains and caused economic loss for the farmers living here. 22% of the affected areas were in the side slope of mid-highlands (101 m) and 7% in the river bank of midlands (61 m).

Edoor Town
Heart of Aralam Village is Edoor. Panchayat and Village offices are situated at Edoor.

Education

The village has a Government Higher Secondary School at Aralam and two aided Higher Secondaries, one at Edoor, St. Mary's HSS and the other at Velimanam, St. Sebastian's HSS.

Tourism
Many people visit Aralam because it is close to the dense western ghats. The village also caters tourists to  Aralam Wildlife Sanctuary.

Transportation
The national highway passes through Kannur town.  Mangalore and Mumbai can be accessed on the northern side and Cochin and Thiruvananthapuram can be accessed on the southern side.  The road to the east of Iritty connects to Mysore and Bangalore.   The nearest railway station is Thalassery towards Calicut and Kannur railway station towards Mangalore. The nearest airport is Kannur International Airport.

References

Villages near Iritty

mr:आरलम संरक्षित वनक्षेत्र